The list of shipwrecks in 1800 includes ships sunk, foundered, wrecked, grounded, or otherwise lost during 1800.

January

1 January

2 January

3 January

4 January

5 January

6 January

7 January

9 January

10 January

12 January

15 January

17 January

19 January

21 January

22 January

23 January

24 January

26 January

31 January

Unknown date

February

2 February

5 February

15 February

27 February

Unknown date

March

7 March

10 March

13 March

17 March

20 March

23 March

27 March

30 March

Unknown date

April

2 April

6 April

8 April

14 April

17 April

23 April

25 April

Unknown date

May

5 May

6 May

8 May

15 May

17 May

20 May

27 May

Unknown date

June

2 June

19 June

27 June

Unknown date

July

6 July

9 July

19 July

Unknown date

August

8 August

10 August

14 August

20 August

22 August

24 August

26 August

Unknown date

September

2 September

7 September

22 September

26 September

28 September

30 September

Unknown date

October

3 October

4 October

8 October

9 October

10 October

15 October

16 October

19 October

20 October

22 October

24 October

26 October

29 October

Unknown date

November

2 November

3 November

8 November

9 November

11 November

12 November

15 November

16 November

18 November

20 November

24 November

25 November

27 November

Unknown date

December

4 December

11 December

14 December

16 December

18 December

19 December

20 December

28 December

31 December

Unknown date

Unknown date

References

1800